The Omega Factor (stylized as The Ωmega Factor) is a British television series produced by BBC Scotland in 1979. It was created by Jack Gerson and produced by George Gallaccio, and transmitted in ten weekly episodes between 13 June and 15 August.

Synopsis

Journalist Tom Crane (James Hazeldine) possesses untapped psychic powers that bring him to the attention of the scientists who comprise Department 7, a secret "need to know only" government organisation which investigates paranormal phenomena and the potential of the human mind. The phenomena explored include hypnosis, brainwashing, extra-sensory perception, telekinesis, poltergeist phenomena, out-of-body experiences and spiritual possession.

Crane joins Department 7 as a means of finding and getting revenge on Edward Drexel (Cyril Luckham), a powerful rogue psychic who is responsible for the death of Crane's wife in a car crash. Crane's work with the department, and his own psychic gift, lead Crane to suspect a deadly conspiracy by a mysterious organisation called Omega to take over the world using mind control. The members of Department 7 include physicist Dr Anne Reynolds (Louise Jameson), an old friend of Crane's wife, and the secretive head of the department, psychiatrist Dr Roy Martindale (John Carlisle). Most episodes see the driven and impetuous Crane in impatient conflict with the cautious Martindale, with Anne (who falls in love with Crane, though she also has a brief relationship with Martindale) caught in the middle. Various subplots develop over the course of the series – notably Crane's hunt for Drexel, his growing suspicions about the Omega conspiracy and his developing relationship with Anne.

Episodes

Only one series of ten episodes was made. The Omega Factor was produced by BBC Scotland and filmed on location in Edinburgh (making use of a number of Edinburgh landmarks such as the Royal Mile, Holyrood Park, and Edinburgh Zoo), with studio production conducted in Glasgow. Unlike most BBC programmes of the day, the series was shot almost entirely on videotape (as opposed to the then-common practice of using film for exteriors) Recurring guest star Natasha Gerson is the daughter of the show's creator. According to her interview for the 2006 DVD release, she auditioned for the role under an assumed name so that the casting agent was not aware of the relation.

The series was originally allotted to run thirteen episodes, but to maintain a certain level of quality, the production was scaled back to ten episodes to allow more money to be budgeted per episode.

A novel by Jack Gerson, telling the story of Crane's hunt for Drexel (a substantially different story from that in the broadcast series, aside from the first episode which the novel duplicated faithfully), was published as a series accompaniment.

Reception
The Omega Factor attracted the criticism of public moralist Mary Whitehouse, who described the episode of "Powers of Darkness" as "thoroughly evil" because it depicted the supernatural and a man burning to death.

Legacy
The series' combination of science fiction, horror and thriller elements, and its narrative focus on shadowy government departments and conspiracies to gain world domination, as well as the chemistry between James Hazeldine and Louise Jameson's characters, was echoed in the 1990s series The X-Files. Although the final episode resolved several of the subplots, it raised several more issues and its ambiguous ending suggests that a second season was anticipated.

Big Finish audio revival 
In 2015 Big Finish Productions began a series of audio plays based on the TV show, with original cast member Louise Jameson reprising her role as Anne Reynolds. The plays are set 30 years after the events of the TV show and feature John Dorney as Adam Dean (Tom Crane's son). The first volume was followed by a second in 2017, with a third series released in 2018.

Main Audio Series

Series 01

Series 02

Series 03

Audiobooks

Home media 

The complete series of The Omega Factor was released by DD Home Entertainment on DVD in Region 2 (UK) on 20 June 2005.

In Region 1, Entertainment One released the complete series on DVD on 2 May 2006.

References

External links

Action TV
Episode Guide
Big Finish audiobooks

1979 British television series debuts
1979 British television series endings
1970s British science fiction television series
1970s British television miniseries
BBC Scotland television shows
BBC television dramas
British science fiction television shows
British supernatural television shows
English-language television shows
Fictional government investigations of the paranormal
Television shows set in Edinburgh
British fantasy television series